The following is a list of video-related topics.

Numbers
 3D
 4:3
 16:9

A-C
 Academy Awards
 Adobe Premiere—real time editing 
 Advanced Authoring Format AAF
 alpha channel
 Animation
 Audio commentary
 Avid—real time editing Avid video editing family
 B-movie
 B-roll
 Betacam
 Betamax
 Blu-ray
 bluescreen/chroma key
 Bollywood
 Camcorder
 Camera
 Canopus DVStorm2—real time editing 
 CCIR 601
 CCD
 Chroma subsampling—4:1:0, 4:1:1, 4:2:0, 4:2:2, 4:4:4
 Cinematography
 Clapperboard
 Closed-captioning
 Comparison of video editing software
 Component video signal
 Composite video signal
 Copy detection
 Cult film

D-F
 Digital audio
 Digital cinema
 Digital cinematography
 Digital film
 Digital video
 DVd
 DVD
 D-VHS
 Entertainment law
 Film
 Film colorization
 Film criticism
 Film distribution
 Film festivals
 Film gauges
 Film genres
 Film institutes
 Filmmaking
 Film preservation
 Film production
 Film rating systems
 Film restoration
 Film styles
 Film technique
 Film theory
 Film trailer
 Final Cut Pro—real time editing 
 filter
 FORscene—video logging, editing, publishing and hosting
 Full screen
 FX

G-J
 Hammer Horror
 HDV
 HDTV
 History of cinema
 Hollywood
 IMAX
 Independent film
 Infrared filter
 Interlace

K-M
 Keyframe
 Kollywood
 Letterbox
 Line (video)
 Linear video editing
 List of video editing software
 Video logging
 Lower thirds
 Movie
 MPEG-1
 MPEG-2
 Multiple-camera setup

N-Q
 neutral density filter aka ND filter
 NHK Twinscam
 non-linear video editing
 NTSC
 PAL
 Photography

R-T
 Safe area
 SCH Phase Display
 SECAM
 Short film
 Soundtrack
 Special effects
 Steadicam
 Super-resolution
 S-VHS
 S-Video
 Synchronization
 Tamil Film Industry
 Telecine
 Television
 time code
 Troma

U-W
 Ulead MediaStudio Pro
 UV filter
 Vectorscope
 VHS
 Video CD
 Video clip
 Videos by Year
 Video editing
 video game
 Video production companies
 Video sharing
 Videography
 Videotape
 Waveform monitor
 Windows Media Video
 W-VHS

X-Z
 YIQ
 YUV

See also
 Outline of film
 Photo slideshow software
 Video editing software

References

Video
Video
Video-related topics